Elfriede Wever (later Senden, 6 July 1900 – 30 November 1941) was a German runner. She competed at the 1928 Olympics in the 800 m event and finished in ninth place.

References

1900 births
1941 deaths
Athletes (track and field) at the 1928 Summer Olympics
Olympic athletes of Germany
German female middle-distance runners
People from Remscheid
Sportspeople from Düsseldorf (region)
20th-century German women